Channa pleurophthalma, the ocellated snakehead is a species of Southeast Asian freshwater fish in the snakehead family.

Description
The body is cylindrical, laterally flattened and has an iridescent greenish or bluish basic color, with two or three big black patches, which are outlined in orange and an additional ocellus on both the opercle and tail fin. The belly is usually yellowish. The long dorsal fin has 40-43 fin rays, while the soft anal fin has  28-31 rays. This species is caught for human consumption and for the aquarium trade.

Distribution and habitat
This species is present in Indonesia in Sumatra and in Borneo. These fish prefer areas with black and clear waters.

Species description and etymology
Channa pleurophthalma was formally described in 1851 by the Dutch ichthyologist Pieter Bleeker as Ophiocephalus pleurophthalmus with the type locality given as Bandjarmasin on Borneo. The specific name is a compound of pleuro- meaning "side" and ophthalma meaning "eyed" a reference to the 2-3 eyespots or ocelli on its flanks and the single eye spots on the gill cover and on its caudal fin.

References

Bibliography
 Nora Brede, Pascal Antler: Art für Art: Schlangenkopffische: Amazonas / Die Gattungen Channa und Parachanna. Natur und Tier-Verlag (2009), 
 Günther Sterba: Süsswasserfische der Welt. Urania-Verlag, 1990, 
 Walter R. Courtenay & James D. Williams: Snakeheads (Pisces, Channidae) − A Biological Synopsis and Risk Assessment. U.S. Department of the Interior, U.S. Geological Survey Circular 1251, 2004 PDF

pleurophthalma
Taxa named by Pieter Bleeker
Fish described in 1851